The Ranizai Expedition was a British-Indian Military Expedition to the North-West Frontier Province in Pakistan.

References

Military expeditions
History of Pakistan
1852 in military history